Kate Armstrong (born 1962) is a Canadian author. She won the 2019-20 Ontario Historical Society Alison Prentice Award for her debut memoir, The Stone Frigate: The Royal Military College's First Female Cadet Speaks Out (Dundurn Press 2019) and was a finalist for the 2020 Kobo Emerging Writer Nonfiction Prize.

Biography 
Kathryn Anne Armstrong was born in Flin Flon, Manitoba; her father worked for Eaton's Catalogue and moved the family frequently due to his work. Armstrong spent the majority of her childhood in British Columbia: Kelowna, Fort St John, Williams Lake, Vernon, and Abbotsford. She studied commerce at the Royal Military College in Kingston Ontario, where she was the first woman to receive a cadet College number: 14390. She graduated in the Class of 1984.

Captain (Ret'd) K.A. Armstrong, CD, served as a Supply Logistics Officer (Air) in the Canadian Armed Forces (1980-1993) at CFB Kingston, NDHQ Ottawa, and 1CFSD Toronto. Upon her release, Armstrong moved to Vancouver, BC, and worked for BC Hydro (1993-2013). She started in Labour Relations, and later worked as a Customer Service Area Manager and a Transmission Scheduling Manager. Eventually Armstrong transferred to the wholly owned subsidiary of Powerex Corp, and worked in the newly deregulated electricity market, at first as a Real Time Electricity Trader and later as a Marketing Manager negotiating long term electricity trade and renewable energy deals.

In 2013, Armstrong left her corporate career to pursue her dream to become a writer.

The Stone Frigate 

In 1980 Armstrong was in the first small cohort of female officer candidates attending Canada's official military academy.  She encountered harassment there.  In 2019 she published The Stone Frigate: The Royal Military College's First Female Cadet Speaks Out, about her experiences at RMC.  The book was nominated for a Kobo Emerging Writer Prize.  In 2020 the Ontario Historical Society gave the book its 2019-20 Alison Prentice Award.

According to the Abbotsford News Armstrong learned that a group of older students targeted her, and tried to "break" her, because they saw her as having leadership material.

A March 2019 review in the eVeritas, a publication for the students and alumni of Canadian Military Colleges, said Armstrong went to the Royal Military College as a way to "escape from a traumatic childhood".  The review praises Armstrong for choosing not to apply a "modern lens" to practices that were routine decades ago: "The author does not apply a modern lens, nor does she claim RMC to have been any worse or better than anywhere else. She simply tells the truth: what was done to her and her peers, how it made her feel, and how it impacted her life. A courageous act."

Armstrong and 31 other women had been enabled to attend RMC by the passage of the Canadian Human Rights Act.  Armstrong and 20 other female officer candidates graduated and became officers.

Works 
 The Stone Frigate : The Royal Military College's First Female Cadet Speaks Out  (2019)

Awards and honours 
 2020: The Stone Frigate was winner of the 2019-20 Ontario Historical Society Alison Prentice Award
2020: The Stone Frigate was a finalist for the 2020 Kobo Emerging Writer Nonfiction Prize

Personal life 
Armstrong lives in Nelson, British Columbia, with her husband, Rick Kutzner, and their three Black Labrador Retrievers.

References

External links 
Official website

1962 births
Living people
Canadian memoirists
Canadian women memoirists
21st-century Canadian women writers
21st-century Canadian non-fiction writers
21st-century memoirists
People from Flin Flon
Writers from Manitoba
Writers from British Columbia
Women in the Canadian armed services
Royal Military College of Canada alumni